Sir Chettur Madhavan Nair PC CIE (24 January 1879 – 3 March 1970) (styled Sir Madhavan Nair) was an Indian lawyer who served as a judge of the Madras High Court and member of the Judicial Committee of the Privy Council.

Early life and education 

Born in Mankara in the Malabar district, Madras Presidency (Now Palakkad District, Kerala), Madhavan Nair was the nephew of C. Sankaran Nair. Madhavan Nair was educated at the Victoria College, Palakkad and matriculated from the Pachaiyappa's High School, Madras. Madhavan Nair graduated from the Madras Christian College and Madras Law College before pursuing his higher education at the University College, London and qualifying as a barrister from the Middle Temple.

Career 

Madhavan Nair started practising as a lawyer in the Madras High Court in 1904. He also served as a law reporter with the Madras Law Journal. Madhavan Nair served as a Government Pleader from 1919 to 1923 and Advocate-General of the Madras Presidency in 1923-24. In 1924, he  had to resign as Advocate-General when appointed temporary judge and was succeeded to the post by T. R. Venkatarama Sastri. Madhavan Nair was appointed permanent judge in 1927. He served as judge of the Madras High Court till retirement on 2 January 1939, upon which he was knighted.  In 1941, Madhavan Nair was appointed to the Privy Council of the United Kingdom.

Family 

Madhavan Nair married Palat Parukutty Amma (Later Lady Madhavan Nair), the daughter of Sir C. Sankaran Nair and thus his cousin. They had two sons - Brigadier Palat Sankaran Nair, Palat Madhavan Nair and a daughter Mrs. Palat Narayani Mahadhava Menon. The couple resided at a property named Lynwood in Madhavan Nair Colony near Mahalingapuram, Madras. Lady Madhavan Nair was the prime benefactor of the Ayyappa Temple in  Madhavan Nair Colony Mahalingapuram. Daughter Narayani married Parakkat Madhava Menon ICS and has two children Parvati Ramkumaran and Janaki Nair. Sir C M Nair's son Palat Madhavan Nair married Parakkat Rema Unni and has three children Sreelata, Madhavan  and Usha

References 

 
 

1879 births
1970 deaths
Indian Knights Bachelor
Companions of the Order of the Indian Empire
Knights Bachelor
Members of the Judicial Committee of the Privy Council
Advocates General for Tamil Nadu
Madras Christian College alumni
19th-century Indian lawyers
People from Palakkad district
20th-century Indian lawyers
Kerala politicians
Indian members of the Privy Council of the United Kingdom
Lawyers in British India
List of Nairs